Gaillard II de Durfort (died 1422), Lord of Duras, Blanquefort, and Villandraut, and Seneschal of Gascony, was a 13th-14th century Gascon nobleman of the Durfort family.

Life
Durfort was the eldest son of Gaillard I de Durfort (died 1356) and Marguerite de Caumont. Gaillard was taken prisoner with Thomas Felton, the Seneschal of Gascony during a skirmish in 1377, near Eymet. Durfort was himself appointed Seneschal of Gascony and served between 1399 and 1415. Durfort died in 1422.

Marriage and issue
Gaillard married Eléonore, daughter of Roger Bernard, Count of Périgord and Eléonore de Vendome and is known to have had the following issue:
Gaillard III de Durfort, married Juliette de La Lande, had issue.
Durfort married secondly Jeanne de Lomagne, it is not known whether they had any issue.

Citations

References

Year of birth unknown
1422 deaths
Gascons
Seneschals of Gascony